Argiope lobata is a species of spider belonging to the family Araneidae. It has a wide distribution encompassing the whole of Africa and stretching to southern Europe and into Asia.

The male of this species is small (body length 6 mm) but the female is large and spectacular at up to 25 mm in length. The silver abdomen is marked with black and red spots and carries deep furrows and distinctive lobes around the edge. As with other spiders in this genus, the large web is usually decorated with prominent zig-zag stabilimenta.

References 

lobata
Spiders of Europe
Spiders of Africa
Spiders of Asia
Spiders described in 1772
Taxa named by Peter Simon Pallas